The United States Post Office-Sewickley Branch at 200 Broad Street in Sewickley, Pennsylvania, was built in 1910.  It was designed by architect James Knox Taylor (who was the Supervising Architect of the United States Department of the Treasury from 1897 to 1912).   This classical revival styled building was added to the National Register of Historic Places on December 26, 2012, and the List of Pittsburgh History and Landmarks Foundation Historic Landmarks in 2000.

References

Post office buildings on the National Register of Historic Places in Pennsylvania
Buildings and structures in Allegheny County, Pennsylvania
Government buildings completed in 1910
Neoclassical architecture in Pennsylvania
Pittsburgh History & Landmarks Foundation Historic Landmarks
National Register of Historic Places in Allegheny County, Pennsylvania